Daniel Joseph Poling (born October 3, 1954 in Parkersburg, West Virginia) is an American politician and a Democratic member of the West Virginia House of Delegates representing District 10 since his January 2007 appointment by West Virginia Governor Joe Manchin to fill the vacancy caused by the resignation of Representative J. D. Beane.

Education
Poling graduated from Parkersburg South High School.

Elections
2012 Poling was unopposed for the May 8, 2012 Democratic Primary, winning with 3,962 votes, and placed third in the four-way three-position November 6, 2012 General election with 11,844 votes (24.7%) behind incumbent Republican Representatives Tom Azinger and John Ellem and ahead of returning 2008 and 2010 Republican opponent Frederick Gillespie.
2008 Poling ran in the four-way May 13, 2008 Democratic Primary and placed second with 4,337 votes (27.1%), and placed third in the six-way three-position November 4, 2008 General election by 9 votes with 10,086 votes (17.5%) behind incumbent Republican Representatives Azinger and Ellem and ahead of Brenda Brum (D), Frederick Gillespie (R), and Iris McCrady (D).
2010 Poling was unopposed for the May 11, 2010 Democratic Primary, winning with 3,200 votes, and placed third in the four-way three-position November 2, 2010 General election with 8,592 votes (23.4%) behind incumbent Republican Representatives Ellem and Azinger and ahead of Republican nominee Frederick Gillespie.

References

External links
Official page at the West Virginia Legislature

Daniel Poling at Ballotpedia
Daniel Poling at the National Institute on Money in State Politics

1954 births
Living people
Democratic Party members of the West Virginia House of Delegates
Politicians from Parkersburg, West Virginia